Vlatković is derived from the South Slavic male given name "Vlatko". It may refer to:

 Uglješa Vlatković (c. 1359—after 1427), Serbian nobleman
 Ivan Vlatković (died 1612), better known as Ivo Senjanin, Croatian outlaw
 Radovan Vlatković (born 1962), Croatian horn player
 Vlatković noble family, served the Kingdom of Bosnia in Zahumlje
 Paskačić noble family, also known as Vlatković, served the Serbian Empire

Croatian surnames
Serbian surnames
Patronymic surnames
Surnames from given names